The A121 road is a road in England connecting Waltham Cross and Woodford Wells. The main settlements on it are Waltham Abbey and Loughton. It also passes through Buckhurst Hill. For much of its length, it passes through the densest part of Epping Forest via Woodredon and Goldings Hills.

The A121 south of the Wake Arms Roundabout is the course of the old turnpike road, and itself includes two by-passes around steep hills at Lower Road, Loughton and North End, on the Loughton- Buckhurst Hill boundary. 

The A121 meets the M25 at Junction 26 (Waltham Abbey Interchange).

References

Roads in England